Golden Eggs is a 1941 American animated short film directed by Wilfred Jackson and produced by Walt Disney, featuring Donald Duck.

Plot
Donald reads a newspaper that the eggs' value is really high and the price amount is increased; he thinks that he could get rich, so he goes into the hen-house and changes the music from the record player. While the hens are dancing and popping their eggs out, Donald collects them and puts them into a huge basket.

Unfortunately, a rooster standing guard reveals Donald and kicks him out. Donald is trying to avoid the rooster, so he disguises himself as a hen. He is mistaken for the rooster's love interest. They dance together, but unfortunately, Donald's disguise falls off. With the rubber glove comb constantly coming loose and a caterpillar falling down the back of his suit, Donald is ever at the risk of being discovered.

Voice cast 
 Clarence Nash as Donald Duck
 Florence Gill, The King Sisters and Margaret Wright as Hens
 Gertrude Lawrence as Rooster

Reception
The Film Daily called the short a "funny cartoon", saying, "Donald runs afoul of the rooster, boss of the barnyard, and is a sadder and wiser man before the rooster finishes with him."

Television
 Donald's Quack Attack, episode #10
 Mickey's Mouse Tracks, episode #67

Home media
The short was released on May 18, 2004, on Walt Disney Treasures: The Chronological Donald, Volume One: 1934-1941.

Additional releases include:
 Walt Disney's Classic Cartoon Favorites: Starring Donald

References

External links
 
 Golden Eggs at The Internet Animation Database
 Golden Eggs on Filmaffinity

1941 films
1941 short films
1941 comedy films
1941 animated films
1940s American animated films
1940s English-language films
1940s Disney animated short films
American animated short films
Donald Duck short films
Animated films about chickens
Films set on farms
Films set in 1941
Films directed by Wilfred Jackson
Films produced by Walt Disney
Films with screenplays by Carl Barks
RKO Pictures short films
RKO Pictures animated short films